Heskestad Church is a parish church of the Church of Norway in Lund Municipality in Rogaland county, Norway. It is located in the village of Heskestad. It is the church for the Heskestad parish which is part of the Dalane prosti (deanery) in the Diocese of Stavanger. The white, wooden church was built in a long church style in 1905 using designs by the architect Victor Nordan. The church seats about 240 people.

History
The earliest existing historical records of the church date back to the year 1380, but the church was not new that year. The medieval stave church was renovated during the first half of the 1600s. In 1734, the old church was torn down and replaced with a new building. In 1827, the church building was again torn down and replaced with a new building. After the new church was completed, the old church was torn down.

See also
List of churches in Rogaland

References

Lund, Norway
Churches in Rogaland
Wooden churches in Norway
20th-century Church of Norway church buildings
Churches completed in 1905
13th-century establishments in Norway